His Lordship Entertains was Ronnie Barker's second vehicle for his Lord Rustless character, first seen three years earlier in Hark at Barker on ITV. This time though, Rustless appeared in a series for BBC2. Hark at Barker had also included sketch inserts, whereas His Lordship Entertains was a sitcom.

Set again in the aristocratic Chrome Hall, which had now become a hotel. It once more starred David Jason as the 100-year-old Dithers and Josephine Tewson as Mildred Bates, two actors who would continue to have a working relationships with Barker. In fact all of the regular cast reprised their roles from Hark at Barker.

Barker wrote all the scripts under the pseudonym Jonathan Cobbald. . He liked to refer to the show as "Fawlty Towers mark one" as it appeared on television three years before that other hotel bound sitcom.

Four episodes of the sitcom have been performed on stage by the University of Nottingham's New Theatre.

Archive status 
For many years it was thought that the series had been entirely lost. However, the first episode of His Lordship Entertains, 'The Food Inspector', was recovered in 2009. In addition the scripts were published in Ronnie Barker's anthology All I Ever Wrote.

Cast

 Ronnie Barker - Lord Rustless
 Josephine Tewson - Mildred Bates 
 David Jason - Dithers
 Mary Baxter - Cook
 Moira Foot - Effie
 Frank Gatliff - Badger
 Mary Merrall - Mrs Ringer 
 Bart Allison - Mr Blunt 
 Gladys Henson - Mrs Ringer's Friend 
 Diana King - Harriet 
 Anthony Sharp - Sir Geoffrey Quick
 Michael Knowles - Mr Smith
 Walter Sparrow - Mr Flint
 Patrick Troughton - The Sheik
 Colin Bean - Guest
 Pamela Cundell - Mrs Featherstone

References

External links 
 His Lordship Entertains at the bbc.co.uk Guide to Comedy
 His Lordship Entertains at Lost Shows

1972 British television series debuts
1972 British television series endings
1970s British children's television series
BBC television sitcoms
Lost BBC episodes
English-language television shows